Averett University is a private Baptist university in Danville, Virginia. Founded in 1859 as a women's college, Averett became a 4-year, coeducational institution in 1969. In 2011, the university restored its Baptist affiliation, renewing a relationship that had existed from Averett's founding until 2005.

History 

The school was chartered in 1859 as Union Female College and became affiliated with the Baptist General Association of Virginia in 1910. The school's name was changed to Averett College and received accreditation as a junior college in 1917. Accreditation by the Southern Association of Colleges and Schools followed in 1928. Averett became a coeducational four-year college in 1969 and offered its first graduate programs in the 1980s. The school changed its name to Averett University in 2001.

In 2005, the Baptist General Association of Virginia dissolved their ties with Averett after the university abandoned Baptist positions on homosexuality. In November 2011, the Baptist General Association of Virginia voted to restore the association's relationship with Averett University.

Admissions 

In 2011, 54% of applicants were admitted. Applications are accepted on a rolling basis.

Academics 

Averett offers associate and bachelor's degree programs in approximately 30 majors. There are also two master's degree programs available: Master of Education degree and a Master of Business Administration degree. The student-to-faculty ratio is 14:1.

Campus 

Averett's main campus is a  campus on West Main Street in Danville. The  North Campus Athletic Center and Averett Flight Center at Danville Regional Airport are also in Danville. The  Equestrian Center in Pelham, NC lies just across the Virginia-North Carolina border.

Averett's adult education program, Graduate and Professional Studies (GPS), has campus centers in Danville, Richmond and Tidewater. GPS classes are offered at 12 locations around Virginia.

Student life

Averett Student Foundation 
Averett Student Foundation members represent the university at special functions such as plays, receptions and donor recognition events.

The Chanticleer 
Averett's student-run news magazine, The Chanticleer, was established in 1922.

Student Government Association 
The Student Government Association (SGA) is Averett's student governing body.

Athletics 
Averett competes in 23 intercollegiate varsity sports, and its athletic teams are called the Cougars. The university is a member of the Division III of the National Collegiate Athletic Association (NCAA), primarily competing in the Old Dominion Athletic Conference (ODAC) since the 2022–23 academic year. The Cougars previously competed in the USA South Athletic Conference (USA South) from 1978–79 to 2021–22.

List of teams

Men's Sports:
 Baseball
 Basketball
 Cross Country
 Football
 Golf
 Lacrosse
 Soccer
 Tennis
 Track & Field
 Volleyball (Coming 2023-24)
 Wrestling

Women's Sports:
 Basketball
 Cross Country
 Golf
 Lacrosse
 Soccer
 Softball
 Tennis
 Track & Field
 Volleyball

Coed Sports:
 Cheerleading
 Dance
 Equestrian
 Esports

Facilities 
Matches are played at "Cougars Den", in Danville, which has a maximum seating capacity of 1,500. Redevelopment of the facility began in 2014 with new turf and lights for the existing stadium, and the field being renamed "Daly Field". Further development of the stadium complex followed, with it being named "Frank R. Campbell Stadium".

References

External links 

 Official website
 Official athletics website

 
Private universities and colleges in Virginia
Educational institutions established in 1859
Universities and colleges accredited by the Southern Association of Colleges and Schools
Education in Danville, Virginia
Buildings and structures in Danville, Virginia
Tourist attractions in Danville, Virginia
1859 establishments in Virginia